Lukyanovskaya is a rural locality (a village) in Mishutinskoye Rural Settlement, Vozhegodsky District, Vologda Oblast, Russia. The population was 82 as of 2002.

Geography 
Lukyanovskaya is located 58 km east of Vozhega (the district's administrative centre) by road. Klimovskaya is the nearest rural locality.

References 

Rural localities in Vozhegodsky District